Provisional Government of Ireland may refer to:
 In Robert Emmet's 1803 rebellion, the notional body in whose name Emmett issued a proclamation of independence.
 In the Fenian Rising of 1867, the notional body in whose name a proclamation of independence was issued.
 Provisional Government of the Irish Republic in 1916.
 Provisional Government of Ireland in 1922.
 In Irish republican legitimatism, the IRA Army Council has been the provisional government since 1938.

See also
 Ministry of Dáil Éireann, executive of the Irish Republic 1919–22, not recognised internationally
 Government of Ireland
 Provisional Government